David A. Rosemont is an American producer.  He has been nominated for five Emmy Awards and four Golden Globes. Rosemont has won the Peabody award, two Critics Choice Awards, The Media Access Award, The Celebration of Diversity Award, The American Film Institute Award of Excellence, the Christopher Award, and the Emmy Award for Outstanding Made for Television Movie for the critically acclaimed Door to Door.

Rosemont has produced for almost every major television studio including ABC, NBC, CBS, Showtime, Lifetime, The History Channel, A&E, PBS, The Hallmark Hall of Fame, DreamWorks, Starz, Scott Free and Turner Network Television where he produced the epic twelve-hour mini series, (Into The West) executive produced by Steven Spielberg which was seen by a record 81 million people during its six-week run on TNT and nominated for 16 Emmys including Best Miniseries. Rosemont also produced the international six-hour miniseries The Company for Sony, TNT and Ridley Scott, starring Michael Keaton, Chris O'Donnell, and Alfred Molina. 
 
Some of Rosemont’s films include Graham Greene's The Tenth Man, The West Side Waltz, Purgatory, Riders of the Purple Sage, The Long Road Home, Henry James' Turn of the Screw, Robin Cook's Harmful Intent, What Love Sees, The Mixed Up Files of Mrs. Basil E. Frankweiler, Passing Glory, The Wool Cap, The Seventh Stream, and a remake of High Noon...
 
Rosemont produced the film Gifted Hands: The Ben Carson Story starring Cuba Gooding, Jr and America starring Rosie O'Donnell. He produced the 8 hour international miniseries, (Pillars of the Earth) based on the bestselling novel by Ken Follett for Scott Free Productions and Tandem Communications and November Christmas for the Hallmark Hall of Fame Productions and CBS. Rosemont produced the family films; Field of Vision and Game Of Your Life for NBC/Procter & Gamble/Walmart, the Hallmark Hall of Fame production of Firelight on ABC, the remake of Steel Magnolias starring Queen Latifah with record breaking ratings, and a four-hour mini series, Bonnie & Clyde for The History Channel directed by Academy Award nominee Bruce Beresford which was  nominated for four Emmy's including Best Mini Series.
 
Rosemont produced The Gabby Douglas Story about the 2012 Olympic champion who won an unprecedented two Gold medals in gymnastics for the United States. His recent films include In My Dreams, One Christmas Eve and a dramatic series for PBS and Scott Free Productions/Ridley Scott called Mercy Street, a medical drama set during the Civil War. Rosemont recently produced MANHUNT:UNABOMBER, a limited series for Discovery Channel and Lionsgate TV about the FBI’s pursuit and apprehension of Ted Kaczynski, the Unabomber.  And Strange Angel, a series for CBS All Access and Scott Free Productions, based on the novel Strange Angel: The Otherworldly Life of Rocket Scientist John Whiteside Parsons by George Pendle. Rosemont is currently producing the series Stumptown for ABC starring Cobie Smulders.

Filmography

Selected awards

References

External links 
 

Living people
Year of birth missing (living people)
Place of birth missing (living people)
American television producers